The NBC Symphony Orchestra was a radio orchestra conceived by David Sarnoff, the president of the Radio Corporation of America, especially for the conductor Arturo Toscanini. The NBC Symphony performed weekly radio concert broadcasts with Toscanini and other conductors and served as house orchestra for the NBC network.

The orchestra's first broadcast was on November 13, 1937, and it continued until disbanded in 1954. A new ensemble, independent of the network, called the Symphony of the Air, followed. It was made up of former members of the NBC Symphony Orchestra and performed from 1954 to 1963, particularly under Leopold Stokowski.

History
Tom Lewis, in the Organization of American Historians Magazine of History, described NBC's plan for cultural programming and the origin of the NBC Symphony:
David Sarnoff, who had first proposed the "radio music box" in 1916 so that listeners might enjoy "concerts, lectures, music, recitals," felt that the medium was failing to do this. By 1937, RCA had recovered enough from the effects of the Depression for it to make a dramatic commitment to cultural programming. Sarnoff proposed to create a radio orchestra and hire Arturo Toscanini to conduct it. Toscanini had recently resigned from the New York Philharmonic at age 69 and was considering retirement; Sarnoff sent Samuel Chotzinoff as an emissary to Italy and he managed to convince the wary Toscanini to accept Sarnoff's offer. On Christmas night, 1937, the NBC Symphony Orchestra gave its first performance with Toscanini in an entirely refurbished studio at NBC located in the RCA Building. "The National Broadcasting Company is an American business organization. It has employees and stockholders. It serves their interests best when it serves the public best." That Christmas night, and whenever the NBC orchestra played over the next 17 years, he was right.

Sarnoff devoted considerable effort and resources to create an orchestra of the first rank for Toscanini and NBC. Artur Rodziński, an orchestra builder and musical task master in his own right, was engaged to mold and train the new orchestra in anticipation of the arrival of Toscanini. It offered the highest salaries of any orchestra at the time and a 52-week contract. Prominent musicians from major orchestras around the country were recruited and the conductor Pierre Monteux was hired as well to work with the orchestra in its formative months. A new large broadcast studio was built for the orchestra at NBC's Radio City Studios in Rockefeller Center, New York, "Studio 8-H". In addition to creating prestige for the network, there has been speculation that one of the reasons NBC created the orchestra was to deflect a Congressional inquiry into broadcasting standards.

The orchestra's first broadcast concert aired on November 13, 1937, under the direction of Monteux. Toscanini conducted ten concerts that first season, making his NBC debut on December 25, 1937. In addition to weekly broadcasts on the NBC Red and Blue networks, the NBC Symphony Orchestra made many recordings for RCA Victor. Televised concerts began in March 1948 and continued until March 1952. During the summer of 1950, NBC converted Studio 8-H into a television studio (the broadcast home of NBC's late-night comedy program Saturday Night Live since 1975) and moved the broadcast concerts to Carnegie Hall, where many of the orchestra's recording sessions and special concerts had already taken place.

Leopold Stokowski served as principal conductor from 1941 to 1944 on a three-year contract following a dispute between Toscanini and NBC. During this time Toscanini continued to lead the orchestra in a series of public benefit concerts for war relief. He returned as Stokowski's co-conductor for the 1942–43 and 1943–44 seasons, resuming full control thereafter. Upon Toscanini's retirement in the spring of 1954, NBC officially disbanded the orchestra, much to Toscanini's distress, though it continued for several years independent of NBC, as the Symphony of the Air. Toscanini's final broadcast concert with the orchestra took place at Carnegie Hall on April 4, 1954, and he conducted the orchestra for the last time during RCA Victor recording sessions held June 3 and 5, 1954.

Musicians
Some notable musicians who were members of the orchestra include violinists Samuel Antek, Leonid Bolotine, Henry Clifton, Felix Galimir, Josef Gingold, Daniel Guilet (concertmaster 1952–54), Harry Lookofsky, Mischa Mischakoff (concertmaster 1937–1952), Albert Pratz, David Sarser, Oscar Shumsky, Benjamin Steinberg, Herman Spielberg, Boris Koutzen and Andor Toth; violists Carlton Cooley, Milton Katims, William Primrose, and Tibor Serly; cellists Frank Miller, Leonard Rose, Harvey Shapiro, Alan Shulman, George Koutzen and David Soyer; double bassists Homer Mensch and Oscar G. Zimmerman; flutists Carmine Coppola, Arthur Lora and Paul Renzi; clarinetists Augustin Duques, Al Gallodoro, David Weber and Alexander Williams; trombonist Norberto (Robert) Paolucci; saxophonist Frankie Trumbauer; oboists Robert Bloom, Paolo Renzi and Chauncey Vernon Kelley, Jr.; bassoonists Elias Carmen, Benjamin Kohon, William Polisi, Leonard Sharrow and Arthur Weisberg; French horn players Arthur Berv, Harry Berv, Jack Berv and Albert Stagliano; Harry Glantz, Bernard Baker, and Raymond Crisara trumpets and tuba player William Bell, among others.

Not all of the NBC Symphony performers were under full-time contracts to NBC. In the early 1950s, for example, only about 55 of these musicians were salaried; the rest were hired under per-service contracts (in line with Local 802 American Federation of Musicians wage scales) to bring the orchestra's performing and recording strength up to the 85 to 100 seen in period photographs and video footage. Even for the salaried members, NBC Symphony duties constituted barely half of their work obligations for NBC; these musicians played in orchestras for other NBC radio and television programs, with many of the wind players also serving with the Cities Service "Band of America" conducted by Paul Lavalle.

Sponsorship
In the first several seasons the NBC Symphony broadcasts were "sustaining" programs, meaning that they were paid for and presented by NBC itself. In later years the broadcasts were commercially sponsored, primarily by General Motors. Under GM's sponsorship the NBC Symphony broadcasts went out under the title of General Motors Symphony of the Air, not to be confused with the later orchestra of the same name. Other sponsors included the House of Squibb, the Reynolds Metals Company, and the Socony Vacuum Oil Company (Mobil).

Recordings
RCA Victor began making studio recordings of Toscanini conducting the NBC Symphony Orchestra for commercial release early in 1938; Mozart's Symphony No. 40, Haydn's Symphony No. 88, Rossini's William Tell Overture and the second and third movements from Beethoven's Op. 135 String Quartet were among the first works to be recorded. The orchestra recorded initially in Studio 8-H, but RCA Victor producer Charles O'Connell soon decided to hold most of the studio recording sessions in Carnegie Hall. However, many live broadcast performances originating in Studio 8H were also released on records, and subsequently on CD. The dry acoustics of Studio 8-H, designed for broadcasting, were found to be less than ideal for recording. Acoustical modifications began in 1939 were thought to have greatly improved the sound of Studio 8H; although most NBC Symphony recording sessions were shifted to Carnegie Hall in 1940, the orchestra recorded in 8-H sporadically as late as June 1950, after which the studio was converted for television broadcasting. From the autumn of 1950 until June 1954, all NBC Symphony radio broadcasts and RCA Victor recording sessions took place in Carnegie Hall.

RCA Victor released the orchestra's recordings on its flagship Red Seal label on the then-standard 78-rpm record format. In 1950, a 1945 recording of Ferde Grofé's Grand Canyon Suite became the NBC Symphony's first LP release (LM-1004). A mainstay of RCA Victor's Red Seal catalog through the 1950s, most of the Toscanini/NBC Symphony recordings were reissued on the lower-priced RCA Victrola label to celebrate Toscanini's centenary in 1967. In the 1980s, RCA began digitally remastering recordings of the orchestra for release on compact disc. A complete reissue of all Toscanini's RCA Victor recordings was released on CD and cassette between 1990 and 1992 and again in 2012. Later advances in digital technology has led RCA (now owned by Sony Music) to claim further enhancement of the sound of the magnetic tapes for later reissues, changing original equalization balances and adding acoustical enhancement, but critics are divided in their judgment. RCA has only reissued recordings that were personally approved by Toscanini, including some broadcast performances such as the seven complete operas he conducted at NBC between 1944 and 1954; however, several other labels have released discs taken from off-the-air recordings of NBC broadcast concerts. Toscanini's final two broadcast programs, in the spring of 1954, were experimentally recorded in stereo, but he did not approve their release; many years passed before they were finally issued by labels other than RCA Victor. Recorded in rather primitive and "minimalist" two-channel sound, the stereo antiphonal effect is striking (if crude); but unfortunately the complete performance from March 21, 1954 of the Tchaikovsky Symphony No. 6 ("Pathetique") is not entirely stereo as the master 2-track tape of the entire 'Allegro molto vivace' third movement had apparently not survived; an artificial stereo synthesis is substituted.  The missing portion of the stereo recording of the third movement was later found.

The complete series of ten NBC Symphony telecasts has been issued on VHS and LaserDisc by RCA in 1990 and on DVD by Testament in 2006. While the videos derive from kinescopes, the sound tracks were carefully synchronized from the highest fidelity transcriptions and tapes that exist.

One of the NBC Symphony Orchestra's most ambitious projects was the recording of the 13-hour musical score for NBC Television's 1952–53 series Victory at Sea. Robert Russell Bennett conducted the orchestra in his arrangements of Richard Rodgers' musical themes for the 26 documentary programs (recorded in Rockefeller Center's Center Theatre). The series is currently available on DVD. The first RCA Victor LP of excerpts was recorded by Bennett and the NBC SO musicians in July 1953. Bennett would later lead stereo recordings of "Volume 2" in 1957, a re-make of "Volume 1" in 1959, and a concluding "Volume 3" in 1961, conducting the "RCA Victor Symphony Orchestra" (members of the Symphony of the Air). RCA has reissued all of these recordings on CD.

In 1954, shortly after the orchestra's final concerts with Toscanini, Stokowski made stereo recordings for RCA Victor of excerpts from Prokofiev's ballet Romeo and Juliet and Gian Carlo Menotti's ballet Sebastian. The recordings were originally issued (monophonically) as "Leopold Stokowski and his orchestra," but reissued as "members of the NBC Symphony Orchestra." On April 6, 1954, just two days after Toscanini's final concert with the orchestra, Guido Cantelli made a recording in Carnegie Hall of César Franck's Symphony in D minor. Though the performance was recorded in stereo, RCA Victor initially issued the recording in mono. The label finally issued the stereo version in 1978.

Symphony of the Air
After the NBC Symphony Orchestra disbanded, some members went on to play with other orchestras, such as Frank Miller (principal cello) and Leonard Sharrow (principal bassoon) with the Chicago Symphony Orchestra. However, many former NBC Symphony members, in an attempt to stay together and preserve the orchestra, regrouped as a new ensemble called the "Symphony of the Air". They made their first recording on September 21, 1954, and gave their first public concert at the United Nations 9th Anniversary Celebration on October 24. On November 14, they appeared on the acclaimed Omnibus TV program in which Leonard Bernstein, making his first television appearance, discussed Beethoven's Fifth Symphony, and Bernstein led the Symphony of the Air during its first season. With an Asian tour under the auspices of the State Department and an attendance of 60,000 at concerts in the Catskills that summer, the first season was a huge success.

In 1960, the CBS Television network also featured the "Symphony of the Air" in its televised prime-time special Spring Festival of Music under the direction of the conductor Alfredo Antonini. In collaboration with the concert pianist John Browning, producer Robert Herridge and director Roger Englander, the orchestra presented a virtuoso live presentation of Sergei Rachmaninoff's Second Piano Concerto.

For nearly a decade, the Symphony of the Air performed many concerts led by Stokowski, the orchestra's music director from 1955. The orchestra recorded widely (on RCA Victor, Columbia, Vanguard and United Artists) under leading conductors, including Stokowski, Bernstein, Monteux, Fritz Reiner, Bruno Walter, Kirill Kondrashin, Sir Thomas Beecham, Alfred Wallenstein and Josef Krips. Only once more did they use their old name, the NBC Symphony Orchestra, in the 1963 telecast of Gian Carlo Menotti's written-for-television opera, Amahl and the Night Visitors, with an all-new cast. The orchestra disbanded in 1963.

Listen to
Toscanini and NBC Symphony Orchestra (1947): Berlioz' The Damnation of Faust (13 minutes)
Toscanini and NBC Symphony Orchestra (1953): Beethoven's Eroica, Third Movement

References

External links

Audiophile Audition: Review of Arturo Toscanini conducts The NBC Symphony: The Television Concerts--1948-52, Volume Four
[ Allmusic: NBC Symphony Orchestra]
"A Toscanini Odyssey" by Mortimer H. Frank
NBC Symphony personnel listing

1930s American radio programs
1940s American radio programs
1950s American radio programs
American classical music radio programs
Disbanded American orchestras
Musical groups established in 1937
Musical groups disestablished in 1963
National Broadcasting Company
Radio and television orchestras
NBC radio programs
1937 establishments in New York City
1963 disestablishments in New York (state)